Gallate dioxygenase (GalA) is an enzyme with systematic name gallate:oxygen oxidoreductase. This enzyme catalyses the following chemical reaction

 gallate + O2  (1E)-4-oxobut-1-ene-1,2,4-tricarboxylate

Gallate dioxygenase contains non-heme Fe2+.

References

External links 
 

EC 1.13.11